Simon Schouten  (born 7 December 1990) is a Dutch long track speed skater who specializes in the longer distances and the marathon.

He won a gold medal at the 2018 European Speed Skating Championships in Kolomna, Russia in the team pursuit event with Jan Blokhuijsen and Marcel Bosker.

At the 2018–19 ISU Speed Skating World Cup – World Cup 1 he finished second in the mass start event behind Andrea Giovannini. 

He is the older brother of speed skater Irene Schouten.

Personal records

He is currently in 92nd position in the adelskalender with 148.032 points.

References

1990 births
Living people
Dutch male speed skaters
People from Andijk
Sportspeople from North Holland